Northumbrian was a dialect of Old English spoken in the Anglian Kingdom of Northumbria. Together with Mercian, Kentish and West Saxon, it forms one of the sub-categories of Old English devised and employed by modern scholars.

The dialect was spoken from the Humber, now within England, to the Firth of Forth, now within Scotland.  In the Danelaw after the Viking invasions, Northumbrian may have been influenced by the Norse language.

The earliest surviving Old English texts were written in Northumbrian: these are Caedmon's Hymn (7th century) and Bede's Death Song (8th century). Other works, including the bulk of Caedmon's poetry, have been lost. 
Other examples of this dialect are the Runes on the Ruthwell Cross from the Dream of the Rood. Also in Northumbrian are the 9th-century Leiden Riddle and the mid-10th-century gloss of the Lindisfarne Gospels.

The Viking invasion forced a division of the dialect into two distinct subdialects. South of the River Tees, southern Northumbrian was influenced by Norse, while northern Northumbrian retained many Old English words lost to the southern subdialect and influenced the development of the dialects of modern North East England (the modern Northumbrian dialect) and Scotland. Today, the Scots language (including Ulster Scots) is descended from the Northumbrian dialect, as are modern Northumbrian, Cumbrian and Yorkshire (particularly in the North/East Ridings and northern West Riding) as well as the North Lancashire dialect.

History

Historical linguists recognise four distinct dialects of Old English: Northumbrian, Mercian, Kentish and West Saxon. The Northumbrian dialect was spoken in the Kingdom of Northumbria from the Humber to the River Mersey (mersey meaning border river) in northern England to the Firth of Forth in the Scottish Lowlands. Today, Modern Scots, Northumbrian, Cumbrian and north/east riding dialects originate purely from Northumbrian, as well as forming the basis for the since Mercian-influenced West Riding and Lancashire dialects. It was significantly different from the dialects spoken by other Kingdoms, especially that of West-Saxon (the primary dialect). Modern Standard English, on the other hand, has its origins in the Mercian dialect.

The Angles brought their language (Englisc) to Northumbria in the 6th century AD, where it reached the modern-day Scottish Lowlands. This form of Northumbrian Old English was first recorded in poetic; e.g. Cædmon's Hymn ), writings of the Venerable Bede and the Leiden Riddle. The language is also attested in the Lindisfarne Gospels , in modern Scotland as a carved runic text, the Dream of the Rood, and on the Ruthwell Cross, . Old Northumbria was later conquered by the Danes (867–883 AD) and from this day forth the language became influenced with Old Norse.

The region of Lothian in the Lowlands, which was originally a part of the Kingdom of England, was invaded by Kenneth III of Scotland and became part of Scotland's sovereign territory. Despite the king being a Scottish Gaelic speaker, he allowed the region to keep its Northumbrian dialect, which was then still known as Inglis. However, the region became divided from Northumbria following the Battle of Carham (with the northern half of the territory under Scottish rule and the southern part under the English); the language north of the divide later became known as Scottis or Scots.

The anonymous author of the Northumbrian Cursor Mundi claimed southern English texts needed to be translated into northern dialects for people to fully understand what they were reading. Ralph Higden in 1364 described Northumbrian as incredibly difficult for southern natives to understand, believing the reason for this to be the "strange men an nations that speaketh stronglie" (i.e. the Scots) the region bordered. John of Trevisa spoke about nearby "strange men an aliens" in discussing northern English's alleged outlandishness, and in  Osbern Bokenam wrote about Scots' influence on northern English in his Mappula Angliae.

By the 14th century, Lowland Scots became the main language of Scotland's Lowlands (excluding Galloway, which still spoke Gaelic). Despite this, Northumbrian began to lose its significance in England by the 16th century. Northumbrian dialectical terms, accents, and manners of speaking were considered incorrect and inelegant to those in power, who were seated in the south of England. As England began to centralise its power in London and the south of England, texts in the midland and southern dialects became the de facto standard. A great number of letters, poems and newspaper articles were written in Northumbrian and Cumbrian dialects throughout the 19th and 20th centuries; however, their use is declining in favour of Standard English. The modern Northumbrian dialect is currently promoted by organisations such as the Northumbrian Language Society and Northumbrian Words Project. Similarly, the closely-related Cumbrian dialect is promoted by the Lakeland Dialect Society.

The Lord's Prayer
Some Scottish and Northumbrian folk still say  or  "our father" and  "thou art".

Bede's Death Song
Fore thaem neidfaerae ‖ naenig uuiurthit
thoncsnottura, ‖ than him tharf sie
to ymbhycggannae ‖ aer his hiniongae
huaet his gastae ‖ godaes aeththa yflaes
aefter deothdaege ‖ doemid uueorthae.

Cædmon's Hymn
Nū scylun hergan ‖ hefaenrīcaes Uard,
metudæs maecti ‖ end his mōdgidanc,
uerc Uuldurfadur, ‖ suē hē uundra gihwaes,
ēci dryctin ‖ ōr āstelidæ
hē ǣrist scōp ‖ aelda barnum
heben til hrōfe, ‖ hāleg scepen.
Thā middungeard ‖ moncynnæs Uard,
eci Dryctin, ‖  æfter tīadæ
firum foldu, ‖ Frēa allmectig.

The Leiden Riddle
Mec se uēta uong,     uundrum frēorig,
ob his innaðae     rest cændæ.
Ni ut ic mec biuorthæ     uullan flsum,
hērum ðerh hēhcraeft,    hygiðonc....
Uundnae mē ni bīað ueflæ,     ni ic uarp hafæ,
ni ðerih ðreatun giðraec    ðrēt mē hlimmith,
ne mē hrūtendu    hrīsil scelfath,
ni mec ōuana    m sceal cnyssa.
Uyrmas mec ni āuēfun    uyrdi craeftum, 
ðā ði geolu gōdueb    geatum fraetuath.
Uil mec huethrae su ðēh   uīdæ ofaer eorðu
hātan mith hæliðum    hyhtlic giuǣde;
ni angun ic mē rigfaerae    egsan brōgum,
ðēh ði n... ...n sīæ    nīudlicae ob cocrum.

Ruthwell Cross inscription

Krist wæs on rodi hwethræ ther fusæ fearran
kwomu æththilæ til anum ic thæt al bih[eald].
Mith strelum giwundad alegdun hiæ hinæ limwoerignæ
gistoddun him (æt his licæs heafdum).

Notes

Further reading
Sweet, H., ed. (1885) The Oldest English Texts: glossaries, the Vespasian Psalter, and other works written before A.D. 900. London: for the Early English Text Society
Sweet, H., ed. (1946) Sweet's Anglo-Saxon Reader; 10th ed., revised by C. T. Onions. Oxford: Clarendon Press. ("Northumbrian texts"—pp. 166–169)

Languages attested from the 7th century
Old English dialects
Northumbria
Language articles with unknown extinction date